Anaisa Pye (alternatively, Anaisa Pie, Anaisa Pie Danto, or Anaisa La Chiquita) is a popular loa within religion in the Dominican Republic. She is considered the patron saint of love, money, and general happiness within the religion in the Dominican Republic 21 Divisions. 

She is often considered extremely flirtatious, generous, and playful by her devotees. She, as well as other worshipers, are concerned for other female loas, as they consider themselves able to provide for anything a person could request.  

Among Dominican Roman Catholic believers, she is syncretized with Saint Anne. Her altars are often decorated with pictures and statues of Saint Anne and the child Mary. She is said to work very well with Belie Belcan, another popular loa who is associated with Saint Michael the Archangel. Icons of Saint Anne are generally placed next to icons of Saint Michael in Vodou households and temples.  

Her feast day is celebrated on 29 July. Her favorite colors are yellow and pink. Some people consider Cachita to be one of her puntos (or incarnations).

See also
 Ayao

References 
Anaisa Pie Danto/Anaisa Pye, SanteriaReligion101
Anaisa Pie, Papa Boko Y Las 21 Divisiones Dominican Vodou
Anaisa Pye, International Vodou Society 
Anaisa Pyé (Archived 2009-10-25), Ozzie's Dominican Voodun

Dominican Vudú
Fortune goddesses
Love and lust goddesses
Voodoo goddesses